Platon Svyrydov (born 20 November 1986, in USSR) is a Ukrainian footballer. He plays for FC Avanhard Kramatorsk.

External links
Profile on Official Site (rus)
 

1986 births
Living people
Ukrainian footballers
FC Shakhtar Donetsk players
FC Kryvbas Kryvyi Rih players
FC Hoverla Uzhhorod players
FC Krymteplytsia Molodizhne players
FC Kramatorsk players
Ukrainian Premier League players

Association football midfielders